"Don't Look Back" is a song by English drum and bass production duo Matrix & Futurebound. It was released on 6 July 2014. The song entered at number 38 on the UK Singles Chart.

Track listing

Chart performance

Weekly charts

Release history

Music video
Two Irish models Sarah Tansey and Thalia Heffernan featured in the music video.

References

2014 singles
Matrix & Futurebound songs
2014 songs
Songs written by Tanya Lacey